Mount Darwin is a town in  Mashonaland Central province in Zimbabwe.

Location
The town lies in Mount Darwin District, in Mashonaland Central Province in north-eastern Zimbabwe.

Overview
In addition to the offices of Mount Darwin Town Council, the town is also the location of the Mount Darwin District Administration. The town has a public hospital, Mount Darwin District Hospital, and a mission hospital, Karanda Mission Hospital. Karanda attends to anywhere from 10 to 20 surgeries and between 200 and 300 outpatients daily. ZB Bank Limited, a commercial bank, maintains a branch in the town. Mount Darwin is also served by Mount Darwin Airport.

History
Mount Darwin is the probable site of some of the earliest European missionary work in southern Africa, by the Portuguese Jesuit Gonçalo da Silveira, who arrived in 1560 and was killed in March 1561 near Mount Darwin following a souring of relations with the local chief. Mount Darwin was named by the hunter and explorer Frederick Courtney Selous after the British naturalist Charles Darwin.

Climate

Population
The current population of Mount Darwin is not publicly known. In 2004, the town's population was estimated at 6,350. The next national population census in Zimbabwe is scheduled from 18 August 2012 through 28 August 2012.

Notable people
The following notable people are associated with Mount Darwin:
 Christopher Kuruneri – A politician; he was an MP representative. 
 Joice Mujuru – A politician; she was born here
 James Makamba – A businessman; he maintains a home in Mount Darwin
 Savior Kasukuwere – A politician; he was born here.

See also
 Shona people
 Manyika people
 Bindura
 Chitungwiza
 Mutare
 Chimoio

References

External links
 Location of Mount Darwin, Zimbabwe At Google Maps
Website of Karanda Hospital

Populated places in Mashonaland Central Province